Mohd Kamaruddin bin Abu Bakar is a Malaysian politician from UMNO. He is the Member of Perak State Legislative Assembly for Kuala Sepetang from 2018 to 2022.

Politics 
He is the acting Chief of UMNO Bukit Gantang Branch.

Election result

References 

United Malays National Organisation politicians
Members of the Perak State Legislative Assembly
Malaysian people of Malay descent
Living people
Year of birth missing (living people)